The N87 road is a national secondary road in the north of County Cavan, Ireland.

Route
The route leaves the N3 at Belturbet and passes through the towns of Ballyconnell and Swanlinbar in north County Cavan before crossing the border with County Fermanagh in Northern Ireland where it becomes the A32 and continues to Enniskillen and Omagh. 

The N87 road is part of the through route from Enniskillen via Swanlinbar and the R202 via Mohill to Dromod connecting with the N4 (Sligo to Dublin) road to Dublin.

See also
Roads in Ireland 
Motorways in Ireland
National primary road
Regional road

References

Roads Act 1993 (Classification of National Roads) Order 2006 – Department of Transport

National secondary roads in the Republic of Ireland
Roads in County Cavan